Kahramanmaraş Airport  is an airport in Kahramanmaraş, Turkey.

Overview
The airport is operated since 1996 and used only for civil aviation. The actual capacity of the Terminal is 400,000 passengers/year. This airport doesn't have an instrumental landing System (ILS) but it has a satellite Controller starting and landing system (RNAP), which is very helpful in bad weather conditions and night flights. Due to rising passenger numbers, on 18 December 2016, the prime minister of Turkey gives the start for a brand new modern Terminal. The new modern Terminal-building includes a domestic and international area. The capacity will be 4 million passengers/year. The apron will take 5 planes at the same time. The new modern Terminal building will be opened in this summer. The airport is 5 km from the city center away. There is also public transportation (taxi, bus) available.

Airlines and destinations

Statistics 

Passenger development

References

External links
 

 

Airports in Turkey
Buildings and structures in Kahramanmaraş Province
Transport in Kahramanmaraş Province